Wild Rider was a compact steel roller coaster located at Six Flags Great Adventure. It was designed by Schwarzkopf and operated from 1978 through 1980.

The coaster was located in the Enchanted Forest area of the park and would be seen behind Mama Flora's Cuchina if it were standing in its original location.

The Wild Rider is often mistaken for a similar looking Italian-built carnival coaster called Big Fury. These are two different roller coasters and the Wild Rider replaced the Big Fury for the 1978 season. The Wildcat was a new roller coaster when it arrived at Great Adventure. A HUSS troika flat ride was named Wild Rider and was removed before this coaster was built. If they existed at the same time, they would have been located across a walkway from one another. At the end of the 1980 season, the coaster was removed and never replaced.

Six Flags Great Adventure
Roller coasters operated by Six Flags
Former roller coasters in New Jersey
1978 establishments in New Jersey
1980 disestablishments in New Jersey